The Dakar-Gorée Swim (French: Traversée Dakar-Gorée) is an annual open water swimming event between the beach of Dakar and Gorée island. The competition is split into a 4500 m race for amateurs and a 5200 m course. The 2020 edition was cancelled due to the COVID-19 epidemic.

References 

Open water swimming competitions